Delna Davis is an Indian actress and Bharatanatyam dancer who works in the Malayalam and Tamil film and television industries.  She had roles in You Too Brutus (2015), Happy Wedding (2016) and Kurangu Bommai (2017).

Career
Delna Davis entered the Tamil film industry  and first worked on the film, Vidiyum Varai Pesu (2014) and then Patra (2015) by Jayanthan, alongside fellow newcomer Mithun Dev and entrepreneur-turned-actor Sam Paul. Portraying a college girl, Delna worked on the film alongside her examinations. Patra had a low profile release across Tamil Nadu in March 2015. Her first Malayalam film, You Too Brutus (2015), also released on the same day, with the actress choosing to retain her original name for her work in Kerala. Before the release of her initial films, Delna signed several other Tamil films including Gnanam's Aakkam and Palani's Oodha which were completed but did not have a theatrical release. Her third and final release of 2015 was the political satire film 49-O (2015), which starred veteran comedian Goundamani in a leading role.

In 2016, Delna first appeared in the Malayalam film Happy Wedding (2016), while her next release was Nanaiyadhe Mazhaiye. She will subsequently be seen in Kurangu Bommai (2017), her biggest Tamil project till date, in a role alongside Vidharth and actor-director Bharathiraja.

Filmography

Television

Serials

Shows

References

External links
 
 

Indian film actresses
Living people
Actresses in Tamil cinema
Actresses in Malayalam cinema
21st-century Indian actresses
Actresses from Thrissur
Actresses in Malayalam television
Actresses in Tamil television
1995 births